Brandberg is a municipality in the Schwaz district of in the Austrian state of Tyrol.

Geography
Brandberg lies in a side valley of the Ziller on the border with Italy.

References

Cities and towns in Schwaz District